Alvor is a closed halt on the Algarve line in the Portimão municipality, Portugal. The section of the line from Portimão to Lagos opened on the 30th of July 1922.

References

Railway stations in Portugal
Railway stations opened in 1922